Proto-Inuit is the reconstructed proto-language of the Inuit languages, probably spoken about  years BP by the Neo-Eskimo Thule people.  It evolved from Proto-Eskimo, from which the Yupik languages also evolved.

Phonology

Doug Hitch proposes the following chart of consonant phonemes:

References

Works cited

Further reading

Inuit languages
Inuit